Yuji Fujimoto (born 7 October 1970) is a Japanese speed skater. He competed in the men's 1000 metres event at the 1992 Winter Olympics.

References

1970 births
Living people
Japanese male speed skaters
Olympic speed skaters of Japan
Speed skaters at the 1992 Winter Olympics
Sportspeople from Hokkaido
20th-century Japanese people